Four Crosses in South Staffordshire, Staffordshire, England. Is a scattered hamlet located between Cannock and Wolverhampton. As well as Penkridge and Hatherton. The hamlet is a very rural area of Cannock Chase District and is the location of the Four Crosses Inn Pub notable for legends that it is haunted. The hamlet is situated on Watling Street (A5). Four Crosses is also home to the former Chase Park Cricket Club. Which closed in 2019 and has been left derelict since closure. 

The hamlet appears on OS Maps as Four Crosses.

References

 
 

Hamlets in Staffordshire
South Staffordshire District